Nguyễn Hoàng Hải, pen name Nguyễn Tất Nhiên (30 May 1952 in Biên Hòa – 3 August 1992 in California) was a Vietnamese poet. In 1980, he emigrated first to France, and then to Orange County.

Published works
 Nàng thơ trong mắt 1966
 Dấu mưa qua đất 1968
 Thiên Tai 1970

References

1952 births
1992 deaths
20th-century poets